Gerald Priestley (2 March 1931 - 21 January 2020) was a former  footballer who played as a winger in the Football League in the 1950s and 1960s. He was born in Halifax.

He started with Nottingham Forest but did not play any League games for them and moved to Exeter City in 1953, before transferring to Grimsby Town. He made over 100 League appearances for Grimsby, before moving to Crystal Palace in 1958.

He was at Palace for two years, and during his time there scored two senior goals for them.

He subsequently transferred to Halifax Town, with whom he made another 105 League appearances.

Gerry died 21 January 2020.

References

External links
Crystal Palace stats at holmesdale.net

1931 births
2020 deaths
Footballers from Halifax, West Yorkshire
Association football wingers
English Football League players
Exeter City F.C. players
Grimsby Town F.C. players
Crystal Palace F.C. players
Halifax Town A.F.C. players
English footballers